Anne Morgan Spalter (born April 16, 1965) is an American new media artist working from Anne Spalter Studios in Providence, Rhode Island; Williamsburg, Brooklyn; and Brattleboro, Vermont. Having founded and taught Brown University's and RISD's original digital fine arts courses in the 1990s, Spalter is the author of the widely used text The Computer in the Visual Arts (Addison-Wesley 1999). Her art, writing, and teaching all reflect her long-standing goal of integrating art and technology.

Spalter's digital mixed media artwork is included in leading contemporary collections in the US, Europe and the Middle East as well as in museums such as the Albright-Knox Art Gallery (Buffalo, NY), the Rhode Island School of Design Museum (Providence, RI), and the Victoria & Albert Museum (London, UK).

Life and work

Spalter first used a computer as an undergraduate at Brown University, Providence, Rhode Island, in the late 1980s. Recognizing its unique power to integrate different disciplines, Spalter created an independent major that culminated in a multimedia novel. She also graduated with a B.A. in Mathematics and in Visual Art. After three years in New York, Spalter returned to Rhode Island to pursue an MFA at the Rhode Island School of Design (RISD).

Spalter initiated and taught the first new media fine arts courses at both RISD and Brown.  Finding a lack of teaching aids she wrote the textbook, “The Computer in the Visual Arts.”  James Faure Walker, artist, author and founder of the British magazine ArtScribe, describes the book, on its jacket, as: “...the first comprehensive work to combine technical and theoretical aspects of the emerging field of computer art and design.” Alvy Ray Smith was an advisor. Reviews in MIT's Technology Review and other publications provide further details.

“The Computer in the Visual Arts” has been used in courses at schools from the University of Washington to Bowling Green State University  to Pratt Institute. It has also been used at schools outside the US such as King's College London.
and Sabancı University, Istanbul. It is on the Victoria and Albert "Computer Art Reading list."
As an educator and artist in this emerging field, Spalter has served on editorial boards of publications such as CG Educational Materials Source (CGEMS), and presented in lectures, including the inaugural series for the Harvard Initiative in Innovative Computing.

In Brown University’s Department of Computer Science, Spalter worked with Thomas J. Watson Jr. University Professor of Technology and Education and Professor of Computer Science  Andries van Dam as Artist in Residence and as a Visual Computing Researcher. She has initiated and published on research projects ranging from color theory and its applications to better color selection tools to a large-scale educational effort to raise visual literacy to the same status as reading and writing in core curricula. In 2007, Spalter left her position at Brown to create art full-time.

Spalter’s art works explore the concept of the “modern landscape” through both the subject matter and the processes used to create the work. She draws on her own travels and digital photographic and video database to create both traditional works and new media still and moving pieces. She is particularly interested in combining traditional strategies with computational processes possible only with the computer.

Her husband, Michael Spalter, Chair of the Board of the Rhode Island School of Design, shares a passion for new media art and is the author of the new media blog Spalter Digital Art Collection. In the 1990s, the two began collecting early art works in the field. They now have the world’s largest private collection of early works in this genre and have lent pieces to the MoMA in New York  as well as museums internationally. A show curated from the Anne and Michael Spalter collection was held in 2011 at the deCordova Museum in Lincoln, MA.

Artwork 

Spalter creates many of her artworks by utilizing an AI generated composition with multiple techniques. Even her drawings and paintings are done using artificial intelligence.

Crypto Art 
Spalter creates crypto art, a form of digital art that is related to blockchain technology.

Drawings and Paintings 
AI Drawing pastel drawing series "Icarus reaches the worm hole. You are alone and it’s the end of the world.” AI Paintings are oil based paintings using an AI algorithm generated composition.

References

External links

1965 births
Artists from Rhode Island
Living people
New media artists
Brown University alumni
People from Pawtucket, Rhode Island
Rhode Island School of Design alumni